2-Chlorostyrene is a chlorinated derivative of styrene with the chemical formula C8H7Cl.

References

Chloroarenes
Vinyl compounds